Città di Montesilvano is a Serie A Elite women's futsal club based in Montesilvano, Italy. They won the championship in season 2015-2016. In 2017 the team will participate in the European Women's Futsal Tournament together with the champions from Spain, Portugal, Russia, Ukraine and the Netherlands.

Current squad

References

Women's futsal clubs